Abbreviations Guide
(Ind.) - Independent
(NA) - No Affiliation
Minor Parties:
(AAEVP) – Animal Alliance Environment Voters Party of Canada
(CAP) – Canadian Action Party
(CHP) – Christian Heritage Party
(Comm.) – Communist Party
(FPNP) – First Peoples National Party of Canada
(Libert.) – Libertarian Party
(Mar.) – Marijuana Party
(M-L) – Marxist–Leninist Party
(NFLP) – Newfoundland and Labrador First Party
(PC) – Progressive Canadian Party
(PPP) – People's Political Power Party of Canada
(Rhino.) – Rhinoceros Party
(WBP) – Western Block Party
(WLP) – Work Less Party

All candidate names are those on the official list of confirmed candidates; names in media or on party website may differ slightly.

Names in bold represent party leaders, cabinet ministers, and the Speaker of the House of Commons.
† represents that the incumbent chose not to run again.
§ represents that the incumbent was defeated for nomination.
‡ represents that the incumbent ran in a different district.

Newfoundland and Labrador

Prince Edward Island

Nova Scotia

New Brunswick

Quebec

Eastern Quebec

Côte-Nord and Saguenay

Quebec City

Central Quebec

Eastern Townships

Montérégie

Eastern Montreal

Western Montreal

Northern Montreal and Laval

Laurentides, Outaouais and Northern Quebec

Ontario

Ottawa

Eastern Ontario

Central Ontario

Southern Durham and York

Suburban Toronto

Central Toronto

Brampton, Mississauga and Oakville

Hamilton, Burlington and Niagara

Midwestern Ontario

Southwestern Ontario

Northern Ontario

Manitoba

Rural Manitoba

Winnipeg

Saskatchewan

Southern Saskatchewan

Northern Saskatchewan

Alberta

Rural Alberta

Edmonton and environs

Calgary

British Columbia

BC Interior

Fraser Valley and Southern Lower Mainland

Vancouver and Northern Lower Mainland

Vancouver Island

Nunavut

Northwest Territories

Yukon

See also
Results of the Canadian federal election, 2004
Results by riding of the Canadian federal election, 2006
Results of the Canadian federal election, 2008
Results by riding of the Canadian federal election, 2011

References

External links
Elections Canada nominations database

Candidates